Tubaran, officially the Municipality of Tubaran (Maranao: Inged a Tubaran), is a 4th class municipality in the province of Lanao del Sur, Philippines. According to the 2020 census, it has a population of 16,896 people.

History
Tubaran is among to the Nine Princess of Unayan (e.g. in Meranau term Andong so Macadar, etc.).

Geography

Barangays
Tubaran is politically subdivided into 21 barangays.

Climate

Demographics

Economy

References

External links
Tubaran Profile at the DTI Cities and Municipalities Competitive Index
[ Philippine Standard Geographic Code]
Philippine Census Information
Local Governance Performance Management System

Municipalities of Lanao del Sur